The OpenLife Grid was a community virtual world developed by the team at 3DX. It was founded in November 2007 by Australian Steve Sima, who is company president at 3DX. The OpenLife grid functionality was similar to that of Second Life's main grid. OpenLife ran on the graphics system WindLight, as the main grid does.

More than 50,000 accounts were created. However, in early 2012, OpenLife changed its name to 3DMee and went offline for a rebuild, but the rebuild suffered from operating problems.

3DMee reportedly closed in November 2013. The 3DMee website indicated that the virtual world may reopen in 2015.

See also
 Second Life

External links
 3DMee website

References

Virtual world communities